Rodway may refer to:

 Eduardo Rodríguez Rodway (born 1945), Spanish singer and musician, former guitarist of the rock band Triana
 Florence Aline Rodway (1881–1971), Australian painter
 Frederick Arthur Rodway (1880–1956), Australian physician, botanist, and plant collector
 James Rodway (1848–1926), Guyanese historian, botanist and novelist
 Leonard Rodway (1853–1936), English-born Australian dentist and botanist
 Norman Rodway (1929–2001), Irish actor
 Steve Rodway, British electronic dance music record producer
 Tommy Rodway (1879–1959), English footballer
 Valerie Rodway (1919–1970), Guyanese song composer